Svenska Vitterhetssamfundet (SVS) or The Swedish Society for Belles-Lettres is a non-profit membership organization formed in 1907 for the purpose of publishing scholarly text critical editions of works by the most important authors in Swedish literature. Membership is 300 kr. (approximately 30 euro) per year and includes a subscription of the volumes published in that year.

President

 1907–1918: Karl Warburg 
 1918–1947: Otto Sylwan 
 1947–1969: Elias Wessén 
 1969–1980: Carl Ivar Ståhle 
 1980–1984: Bertil Molde 
 1984–2013: Sture Allén 
 2013–2019: Anders Olsson 
 2019–: Paula Henrikson

Publications

Between 1910 and 2004, the society has published 250 volumes covering 30-some authors. The first to be presented in full text on the Internet is Carl Jonas Love Almqvist. The publishing plan for this author alone comprises 51 volumes of which 11 are now available online.

Swedish authors published by SVS
Olof von Dalin (1708-1763)
Carl Gustaf Leopold (1756-1829)
Erik Johan Stagnelius (1793-1823)
Lars Johansson, "Lasse Lucidor" (1638-1674)
Carl Michael Bellman (1740-1795)
Anna Maria Lenngren (1754-1817)
Gunno Eurelius Dahlstierna (1661-1709)
Georg Stiernhielm (1598-1672)
Johan Henric Kellgren (1751-1795)
Carl August Ehrensvärd (1745-1800)
Hedvig Charlotta Nordenflycht (1718-1763)
Erik Sjöberg, "Vitalis" (1794-1828)
Jacob Wallenberg (1746-1778)
Bengt Lidner (1757-1793)
Thomas Thorild (1759-1808)
Johan Ludvig Runeberg (1804-1877)
Johan Runius (1679-1713)
Viktor Rydberg (1828-1895)
August Strindberg (1849-1912)
Carl Jonas Love Almqvist (1793-1866)
Johan Olof Wallin (1779-1839)
Per Daniel Amadeus Atterbom (1790-1855)
Gustaf Rosenhane, "Skogekär Bergbo" (1619-1684)
Fredrika Bremer (1801-1865)
Emilie Flygare-Carlén (1807-1892)
Samuel Columbus (1642-1679)
Urban Hiärne (1641-1724)
Israel Holmström (1661-1708)
Sophie von Knorring (1797-1848)
Hans Gustaf Rålamb (1716-1790)
Haquin Spegel (1645-1714)
Johan Gabriel Werving (1675-1715)

See also
Swedish Academy
List of Swedish language poets
List of Swedish language writers

References

External links
The Swedish Society for Belles-Lettres (website)
Svenska Vitterhetsamfundet
Collected Works of C.J.L. Almqvist

1907 establishments in Sweden
Learned societies of Sweden
Organizations established in 1907